Fisher Memorial Home is an historic structure located at 300 E. 8th Street in Casa Grande, Arizona. The building was included on the National Register of Historic Places, before being removed on January 31, 2019, having been destroyed by fire in April 2017.

See also
 List of historic properties in Casa Grande, Arizona
 National Register of Historic Places listings in Pinal County, Arizona

References

External links

Buildings and structures in Casa Grande, Arizona
Former National Register of Historic Places in Arizona
Pueblo Revival architecture in Arizona